Orthocomotis carolina is a species of moth of the family Tortricidae. It is found in Carchi Province, Ecuador.

The wingspan is 24 mm. The ground colour of the forewings is cream with greyish surfaces in the dorsal half and along the edges of the wing. The markings are pale ochreous yellow scaled with black-brown. The hindwings are brown-grey with grey cream dots.

Etymology
The species name refers to the name of the village La Carolina near the Reserve Golondrinas, the type location of the species.

References

Moths described in 2007
Orthocomotis